The 1959–60 Toronto Maple Leafs season saw the Maple Leafs finish in second place in the National Hockey League (NHL) with a record of 35 wins, 26 losses, and 9 ties for 79 points. They defeated the Detroit Red Wings in six games in the Semi-finals before being swept by their arch-rivals, the Montreal Canadiens, in the Stanley Cup Finals.

Regular season

Final standings

Record vs. opponents

Schedule and results

Playoffs
Montreal swept the Chicago Black Hawks in four games to reach the Final. In the other semi-final, Toronto defeated the Detroit Red Wings four games to two.

The Stanley Cup Final Series
Montreal swept the Maple Leafs, outscoring them 15–5, en route to being the first team since the 1952 Detroit Red Wings to go without a loss in the playoffs.

After the series Rocket Richard retired. He went out with style, finishing with his 34th final-series goal in the third game.

Toronto Maple Leafs vs. Montreal Canadiens

Montreal wins best-of-seven series 4 games to 0

Player statistics

Forwards
Note: GP= Games played; G= Goals; AST= Assists; PTS = Points; PIM = Points

Defencemen
Note: GP= Games played; G= Goals; AST= Assists; PTS = Points; PIM = Points

Goaltending
Note: GP = Games played; W = Wins; L = Losses; T = Ties; SO = Shutouts; GAA = Goals against average

Awards and records
 Allan Stanley, Defence, NHL Second All-Star Team

Transactions

References

Toronto Maple Leafs seasons
Toronto Maple Leafs season, 1959-60
Tor
1960 Stanley Cup